A smiley is a sketchy representation of a smiling face, usually yellow. "Smiling" emoticons are also sometimes called smileys.

Smiley may also refer to:

Places

United States 
 Smiley Township, Pennington County, Minnesota
 Smiley, Texas, a city
 Smiley, Virginia, an unincorporated community
 Smiley Mountain, Idaho

Elsewhere 
 Smiley, Saskatchewan, Canada, a village
 1613 Smiley, an asteroid
 (15760) 1992 QB1, a trans-Neptunian object, the first discovered, for which Smiley was an early proposed name

Arts and entertainment

Film and television 
 Smiley (1956 film), an Australian film
 Smiley Face (film), an American comedy film
 Smiley (2012 film), an American psychological slasher film
 Smiley (TV series), a Spanish romantic comedy television series.

Music

Performers 
 Smiley (musician), Aruba-born Dutch reggae musician, formerly of reggae band Out of Many
 Smiley (rapper), Canadian rapper 
 Smiley (singer), Romanian singer, songwriter, producer
 Smiley, pseudonym of Kyle Ward (musician), contributor to the In The Groove dance music game series
 Smiley, nickname for record producer Warryn Campbell (born 1975)
 Smiley Burnette, stage name of singer-songwriter, musician, film and TV actor Lester Alvin Burnette (1911–1967)
 Smiley Lewis (1913–1966), stage name of American New Orleans rhythm and blues singer and guitarist Overton Lemons (1913–1966)

Songs 
 "Smiley", a 1969 song by Ronnie Burns
 "Smiley", a song on The Smashing Pumpkins' Peel Sessions EP
 "Smiley", a 2022 song by Choi Ye-na

People and fictional characters 
 Smiley (surname), a list of people and fictional characters with the surname
 Smiley Creswell (born 1959), American former National Football League player 
 Smiley (nickname), a list of people and fictional characters
 Living Smile Vidya (born 1982), or Smiley, Indian trans woman actor, assistant director, writer, and trans and Dalit rights activist

Other uses 
 Smiley baronets, a title in the Baronetage of the United Kingdom
 the cookie mascot at Eat'n Park
 a common name for an upper lip frenulum piercing
 another name for a chainlock, an improvised weapon made from a length of chain attached to a lock or other heavy piece of metal
 Smiley (alligator), at the time of his death, the oldest alligator in captivity
 Smiley face curve, another name for "mid scoop" audio signal processing
 Smiley,  a South Africa local name for a roasted sheep's head

See also 
 "Mr. Smiley", a song by Poison from Crack a Smile
 "Mr. Smiley", a song by Mustard Plug on Big Daddy Multitude
 Miley Cyrus, known as Smiley Miley
 Smillie, a surname
 Smylie, a surname
 Smilie (disambiguation)
 Smiley Face (disambiguation)
 Smyley Island, Antarctica